Sporathylacium was a genus of land plant known from its bivalved sporangia. It is known from charcoalified Early Devonian deposits, its type locality being the Brown Clee Hill lagerstätten. It was listed as a rhyniophyte by Hao and Xue in 2013.

References 

Enigmatic plant taxa
Prehistoric plant genera